The 2016–17 season is Gorica's 26th season in the Slovenian PrvaLiga, Slovenian top division, since the league was created in 1991 with Gorica as one of the league's founding members. Gorica compete in Slovenian PrvaLiga, Slovenian Football Cup and UEFA Europa League.

Players
As of 13 December 2016

Source:ND Gorica

Transfer

Pre-season and friendlies

Summer

Competitions

Overall

Overview
{| class="wikitable" style="text-align: center"
|-
!rowspan=2|Competition
!colspan=8|Record
|-
!
!
!
!
!
!
!
!
|-
| PrvaLiga

|-
| Cup

|-
| Europa League

|-
! Total

PrvaLiga

League table

Results summary

Results by round

Matches

Cup

Round of 16

Quarter-finals

UEFA Europa League

First qualifying round

Statistics

Goalscorers

Slovenian PrvaLiga
7 goals
 Miran Burgić

5 goals
 Sandi Arčon

4 goals
 Rifet Kapić

2 goals
 Andrej Kotnik
 Dejan Žigon

1 goal
 Sandi Arčon
 Tine Kavčič
 Miha Gregorič

Slovenian Football Cup
2 goals
 Andrej Kotnik

1 goal
 Miran Burgić
 Gianluca Franciosi

See also
2016–17 Slovenian PrvaLiga
2016–17 Slovenian Football Cup
2016–17 UEFA Europa League

References

External links
Official website 
PrvaLiga profile 
Official UEFA profile
Soccerway profile

Slovenian football clubs 2016–17 season
2016–17 UEFA Europa League participants seasons